Nason is a city in Jefferson County, Illinois, United States. The population was 236 people as of the 2010 census, making it the least populous incorporated city in the state of Illinois. It is part of the Mount Vernon Micropolitan Statistical Area.

Geography
It sits between the two northern arms of Rend Lake, a reservoir on the Big Muddy River.

Demographics

As of the census of 2000, there were 234 people, 101 households, and 64 families residing in the city. The racial makeup of the city was 99.15% White and 0.85% from other races. None of the population were Hispanic or Latino of any race.

There were 101 households, out of which 21.8% had children under the age of 18 living with them, 54.5% were married couples living together, 5.9% had a female householder with no husband present, and 36.6% were non-families.  28.7% of all households were made up of individuals, and 10.9% had someone living alone who was 65 years of age or older.  The average household size was 2.32 and the average family size was 2.83.

In the town the population was spread out, with 16.7% under the age of 18, 9.8% from 18 to 24, 29.1% from 25 to 44, 27.8% from 45 to 64, and 16.7% who were 65 years of age or older.  The median age was 40 years.  For every 100 females, there were 120.8 males.  For every 100 females age 18 and over, there were 114.3 males.

The median income for a household in the city was $33,125 and the median income for a family was $34,375.  Males had a median income of $35,313 versus $17,500 for females.  The per capita income for the city was $15,866.  None of the families and 4.6% of the population were living below the poverty line, including no one under 18 years of age and 8.3% of those over 64 years of age.

References

Cities in Jefferson County, Illinois
Populated places established in 1923
Cities in Illinois